Nicholas Penny (18 September 1674 – 18 January 1745) was Dean of Lichfield from 1730 until his death.

Penny was born in St Dunstan-in-the-West, City of London and educated at Queens' College, Cambridge. He held livings at Hardwick, Cambridgeshire, Hickling, Nottinghamshire and Beddington, Surrey. He died in Beddington in 1745.

References

Alumni of Queens' College, Cambridge
People from the City of London
18th-century English Anglican priests
Deans of Lichfield
1674 births
1745 deaths